Papenvoort may refer to:

 Papenvoort (Drenthe), Netherlands
 Papenvoort (North Brabant), Netherlands